Circle City, or The Circle City, might refer to:

Communities

Australia
Canberra, the capital of Australia, also nicknamed "Circle City"

United States
Circle, Alaska
Dothan, Alabama, nicknamed "The Circle City"
Circle City, Arizona
Corona, California, nicknamed "'The Circle City"
Indianapolis, Indiana, nicknamed "Circle City"
Circle, Montana
Pittsboro, North Carolina, nicknamed "Circle City"

Other uses
Circle City Airport, in Circle Alaska
Circle City Classic, an annual American football game in Indianapolis, Indiana
Circle City Conference, an athletic conference of the  Indiana High School Athletic Association
Circle City Derby Girls, a flat track roller derby league in Indianapolis, Indiana
Circle City Prep, a public charter school in Indianapolis, Indiana

See also
Places under Circle (disambiguation)
 City Circle (disambiguation)